Isak Rosén (born 15 March 2003) is a Swedish professional ice hockey right winger for the Rochester Americans in the American Hockey League (AHL) as a prospect for the Buffalo Sabres in the National Hockey League (NHL). Rosén was drafted in the first round, 14th overall, by the Sabres in the 2021 NHL Entry Draft.

Playing career
Rosén made his Swedish Hockey League (SHL) debut with Leksands IF during the 2019–20 SHL season, playing in a single game. Isak was drafted by the Buffalo Sabres in the first round of the 2021 NHL Entry Draft.

On 1 June 2022, Rosén was signed to a three-year, entry-level contract with the Buffalo Sabres.

Career statistics

Regular season and playoffs

International

References

External links

2003 births
Living people
Buffalo Sabres draft picks
Leksands IF players
Mora IK players
National Hockey League first-round draft picks
Rochester Americans players
Ice hockey people from Stockholm
Swedish ice hockey right wingers